Juanes de Ávila or Juanes Dávila (born 1514, died in the 1500s) was a Licentiate in law and civil servant of the Spanish Empire who was governor and captain general of Cuba between 1544 and 1546.

Biography 
Juanes de Ávila was born in the Crown of Castile. He received a licentiate degree. He was named governor and captain general of Cuba in 1544, and arrived in Santiago de Cuba on February 10, 1544. 

During his administration, Dávila developed monopolies to his own benefit, restricted municipal councils, intimidated Cuban inhabitants and accepted bribes, so he was charged and sent to trial. He died in the Spanish Empire in the 16th century.

References 

1514 births
16th-century deaths
Governors of Cuba
Year of death missing